Admirals All is a 1935 British comedy film directed by Victor Hanbury and starring Wynne Gibson, Gordon Harker, Anthony Bushell and George Curzon. It was based on the 1934 play of the same title by Ian Hay and Stephen King-Hall.

Premise
A temperamental female film star (Gibson) arrives in China to film her next movie, but becomes inadvertently involved with local bandits.

Cast
 Wynne Gibson as Gloria Gunn
 Gordon Harker as Petty Officer Dingle
 Anthony Bushell as Flag Lieutenant Steve Langham
 George Curzon as Pang Hi
 Joan White as Prudence Stallybrass
 Henry Hewitt as Flag Captain Knox
 Percy Walsh as Admiral Westerham
 Wilfrid Hyde-White as Mr Stallybrass
 Gwyneth Lloyd as Jean Stallybrass
 Ben Welden as Adolph Klotz

See also
O.H.M.S.

References

External links
 

1935 films
1935 comedy films
British comedy films
Films set in China
Films about actors
Films based on works by Ian Hay
Films directed by Victor Hanbury
Films scored by Jack Beaver
Seafaring films
Films shot at Beaconsfield Studios
British black-and-white films
1930s English-language films
1930s British films